Dry measures are units of volume to measure bulk commodities that are not fluids and that were typically shipped and sold in standardized containers such as barrels. They have largely been replaced by the units used for measuring volumes in the metric system and liquid volumes in the imperial system but are still used for some commodities in the US customary system. They were or are typically used in agriculture, agronomy, and commodity markets to measure grain, dried beans, dried and fresh produce, and some seafood.  They were formerly used for many other foods, such as salt pork and salted fish, and for industrial commodities such as coal, cement, and lime.

The names are often the same as for the units used to measure liquids, despite representing different volumes. The  larger volumes of the dry measures apparently arose because they were based on heaped rather than "struck" (leveled) containers.

Today, many units nominally of dry measure have become standardized as units of mass (see bushel); and many other units are commonly conflated or confused with units of mass.

Metric units
In the original metric system, the unit of dry volume was the stere, equal to a one-meter cube, but this is not part of the modern metric system; the liter and the cubic meter are now used.  However, the stere is still widely used for firewood.

Imperial and US customary units
In US customary units, most units of volume exist both in a dry and a liquid version, with the same name, but different values: the dry hogshead, dry barrel, dry gallon, dry quart, dry pint, etc.   The bushel and the peck are only used for dry goods.  Imperial units of volume are the same for both dry and liquid goods.  They have a different value from both the dry and liquid US versions.

Many of the units are associated with particular goods, so for instance the dry hogshead has been used for sugar and for tobacco, and the peck for apples.  There are also special measures for specific goods, such as the cord of wood, the sack, the bale of wool or cotton, the box of fruit, etc.

Because it is difficult to measure actual volume and easy to measure mass, many of these units are now also defined as units of mass, specific to each commodity, so a bushel of apples is a different weight from a bushel of wheat (weighed at a specific moisture level).  Indeed, the bushel, the best-known unit of dry measure because it is the quoted unit in commodity markets, is in fact a unit of mass in those contexts.

Conversely, the ton used in specifying tonnage and in freight calculations is often a volume measurement rather than a mass measurement.

In US cooking, dry and liquid measures are the same: the cup, the tablespoon, the teaspoon.

US dry measures are 16% larger than liquid measures.

Struck and heaped measurement
The volume of bulk goods is usually measured by filling a standard container, so the containers' names and the units' names are often the same, and indeed both are called "measures".   Normally, a level or struck measure is assumed, with the excess being swept off level ("struck") with the measure's brim—the stick used for this is called a "strickle".  Sometimes heaped or heaping measures are used, with the commodity heaped in a cone above the measure.

There was historically a tendency for landowners to demand heaped bushels of commodities from their peasants, while at the same time peasants were obliged to purchase commodities from stricken containers. Rules outlawing this practice were circumvented through use of heavy round strickles, which would compress the contents of a bushel.

US units of dry measure

(rounded to 4 digits)

References

Units of volume